The 1928 Wiley Wildcats football team was an American football team that represented Wiley College in the Southwestern Athletic Conference (SWAC) during the 1928 college football season. In their sixth season under head coach Fred T. Long, the team compiled a 9–0–1 record, won the SWAC championship, and outscored opponents by a total of 282 to 28.  Wiley and Bluefield Institute were recognized by the Pittsburgh Courier as the black college national co-champions.

Schedule

References

Wiley
Wiley Wildcats football seasons
Black college football national champions
Southwestern Athletic Conference football champion seasons
College football undefeated seasons
Wiley Wildcats football